The Athens Prefecture was one of the prefectures of Greece. It was part of the Attica region  and the Athens-Piraeus super-prefecture. The capital of the prefecture was the city of Athens. After Lefkada Prefecture it was the second-smallest in Greece, but was the most populous and most densely populated. It covered the central part of the agglomeration of Athens. Its extremities lied in the municipalities or communities of Chaidari in the west, Ekali in the north, Penteli in the east, and Glyfada in the south. It bordered East Attica Prefecture to the northeast, east, and southeast, West Attica Prefecture to the northwest, and Piraeus Prefecture and the Saronic Gulf to the west.

Regional units 
In 2011 the prefecture was abolished and the territory is now covered by:
 North Athens (regional unit)
 West Athens (regional unit)
 Central Athens (regional unit)
 South Athens (regional unit)

Municipalities and communities

External links

Official website 

Prefectures of Greece
Geography of Attica
1972 establishments in Greece
States and territories established in 1972
History of Athens
2010 disestablishments in Greece
States and territories disestablished in 2010